King of the Rodeo is a 1929 American silent Western film directed by Henry MacRae and produced by and starring Hoot Gibson. It was distributed through Universal Pictures.

Plot
Gibson here plays Montana Kid, son of the lead character in Chip of the Flying U (1926).

Cast
 Hoot Gibson as Montana Kid
 Kathryn Crawford as Dulcie Harlan
 Slim Summerville as Slim
 Charles K. French as Chip Sr.
 Monte Montague as Weasel
 Joseph W. Girard as Harlan
 Jack Knapp as Shorty
 Harry Todd as J. G.
 Bodil Rosing as Mother

Preservation status
A print has been preserved at the Library of Congress Packard Campus for Audio-Visual Conservation.

References

External links

 
 

1929 films
Films directed by Henry MacRae
Universal Pictures films
1929 Western (genre) films
American black-and-white films
Silent American Western (genre) films
1920s American films
1920s English-language films